The United States Department of Health and Human Services (HHS) is a cabinet-level executive branch department of the U.S. federal government created to protect the health of the U.S. people and providing essential human services. Its motto is "Improving the health, safety, and well-being of America". Before the separate federal Department of Education was created in 1979, it was called the Department of Health, Education, and Welfare (HEW).

HHS is administered by the Secretary of Health and Human Services, who is appointed by the president with the advice and consent of the United States Senate. The position is currently held by Xavier Becerra.

The United States Public Health Service Commissioned Corps, the uniformed service of the PHS, is led by the Surgeon General who is responsible for addressing matters concerning public health as authorized by the secretary or by the assistant secretary for Health in addition to his or her primary mission of administering the Commissioned Corps.

History

Federal Security Agency

The Federal Security Agency (FSA) was established on July 1, 1939, under the Reorganization Act of 1939, P.L. 76–19. The objective was to bring together in one agency all federal programs in the fields of health, education, and social security. The first Federal Security Administrator was Paul V. McNutt. The new agency originally consisted of the following major components: (1) Office of the Administrator, (2) Public Health Service (PHS), (3) Office of Education, (4) Civilian Conservation Corps, and (5) Social Security Board.

Department of Health, Education, and Welfare

The Department of Health, Education, and Welfare (HEW) was created on April 11, 1953, when Reorganization Plan No. 1 of 1953 became effective. HEW thus became the first new Cabinet-level department since the Department of Labor was created in 1913. The Reorganization Plan abolished the FSA and transferred all of its functions to the secretary of HEW and all components of the agency to the department. The first secretary of HEW was Oveta Culp Hobby, a native of Texas, who had served as commander of the Women's Army Corps in World War II and was editor and publisher of the Houston Post. Sworn in on April 11, 1953, as secretary, she had been FSA administrator since January 21, 1953.

The six major program-operating components of the new department were the Public Health Service, the Office of Education, the Food and Drug Administration, the Social Security Administration, the Office of Vocational Rehabilitation, and St. Elizabeth's Hospital. The department was also responsible for three federally aided corporations: Howard University, the American Printing House for the Blind, and the Columbia Institution for the Deaf (Gallaudet College since 1954).

Department of Health & Human Services
The Department of Health, Education, and Welfare was renamed the Department of Health & Human Services (HHS) on October 17, 1979, when its education functions were transferred to the newly created United States Department of Education under the Department of Education Organization Act. HHS was left in charge of the Social Security Administration, agencies constituting the Public Health Service, and Family Support Administration.

In 1995, the Social Security Administration was removed from the Department of Health & Human Services, and established as an independent agency of the executive branch of the United States Government.

The 2010 United States federal budget established a reserve fund of more than $630 billion over 10 years to finance fundamental reform of the health care system.

Organization

Internal structure
The Department of Health & Human Services is led by the United States Secretary of Health and Human Services, a member of the United States Cabinet appointed by the President of the United States with the consent of the United States Senate. The secretary is assisted in managing the department by the Deputy Secretary of Health and Human Services, who is also appointed by the president. The secretary and deputy secretary are further assisted by seven assistant secretaries, who serve as top departmental administrators.

As of January 20, 2018, this is the top level of the organizational chart. HHS provides further organizational detail on its website.

Several agencies within HHS are components of the U.S. Public Health Service (PHS), as noted below.

Immediate Office of the Secretary 
The Immediate Office of the Secretary (IOS) is the top-level unit that directly reports to the Secretary of Health and Human Services.  They assist in the administration of HHS and include the following components:
 Office of the Deputy Secretary (DS) – an Executive Schedule, Level II Position.  This role is responsible for all departmental operations.
 Office of the Chief of Staff (COS) – This role is responsible for staff coordination and support.
 Office of the General Counsel (OGC)
 Executive Secretariat (ES or ExecSec) – Develops and reviews rules, regulations, correspondences, Reports to Congress, and other policy-related documents and decisions.  Headed by the Executive Secretary to the Department and assisted by the Deputy Executive Secretary.
 Office of Health Reform – Oversees the implementation of new policies and legislation.
 Office of the Chief Technology Officer (CTO) – Oversees the use of Data and Technology implementations in HHS.
 Office of National Security (ONS) – A department-wide office that provides oversight, policy direction, standards, and performance assessments on all intelligence and national security related programs within HHS.

Office of the Secretary 
The Office of the Secretary (OS) is the unit directly below the Immediate Office of the Secretary, but still directly reports to the Secretary.  This unit consists of the offices of assistant secretaries including:
 Office of the Assistant Secretary of Health and Human Services for Financial Resources (ASFR)
 Office of the National Coordinator for Health Information Technology (ONC)
 Office of the Assistant Secretary of Health and Human Services for Public Affairs (ASPA)
 Office of the Assistant Secretary for Legislation (ASL)
 Office of the Assistant Secretary of Health and Human Services for Planning and Evaluation (ASPE)

Office of Intergovernmental and External Affairs 
The Office of Intergovernmental and External Affairs (IEA) serves as the liaison to state, local and tribal governments as well as NGOs.  Through the IEA, HHS directs oversees current federal health programs at the regional and tribal level.
 Headquarters Staff – assists the HHS Secretary in developing policies related to state and local government relations.
 Tribal Affairs – serves as the point of contact for HHS regarding HHS programs on Indian reservations.
 Center for Faith-based and Neighborhood Partnerships (a.k.a. the Partnership Center) – works to create partnerships with faith-based and community organizations at the local level.
 Office of Human Resources – the department-wide office for HR related issues.
 Regional Offices – Work with the subordinated state governments to institute HHS policy in the respective regions.  Each office is led by a presidential-appointed regional director.  The following

U.S. Public Health Service 
Within HHS is a collection of agencies and offices that fall under the Public Health Service. The PHS also is home to the Public Health Service Commissioned Corps (PHSCC).
 Office of the Assistant Secretary for Health (OASH) and the U.S. Surgeon General
 Office of Global Affairs
The subordinate operating agencies under the Public Health Service:
 National Institutes of Health (NIH)
 Centers for Disease Control and Prevention (CDC)
 Indian Health Service (IHS)
 Food and Drug Administration (FDA)
 Agency for Toxic Substances and Disease Registry (ATSDR)
 Health Resources and Services Administration (HRSA)
 Agency for Healthcare Research and Quality (AHRQ)
 Substance Abuse and Mental Health Services Administration (SAMHSA)
 Administration for Strategic Preparedness and Response (ASPR)

Human Services agencies 
This list includes the subordinate agencies that do not fall under the Public Health Service, but are under HHS:
 Administration for Children and Families (ACF)
 Administration for Community Living (ACL)
 Centers for Medicare & Medicaid Services (CMS) – formerly the Health Care Financing Administration.

Office of Inspector General
The Office of Inspector General, U.S. Department of Health and Human Services (OIG) investigates criminal activity for HHS. The special agents who work for OIG have the same title series "1811" as other federal criminal investigators, such as the FBI, HSI, ATF, DEA and Secret Service. They receive their law enforcement training at the U.S. Department of Homeland Security's Federal Law Enforcement Training Center in Glynco, Georgia.  OIG Special Agents have special skills in investigating white collar crime related to Medicare and Medicaid fraud and abuse. Organized crime has dominated the criminal activity relative to this type of fraud.

HHS-OIG investigates tens of millions of dollars in Medicare fraud each year. In addition, OIG will continue its coverage of all 50 states and the District of Columbia by its multi-agency task forces (PSOC Task Forces) that identify, investigate, and prosecute individuals who willfully avoid payment of their child support obligations under the Child Support Recovery Act.

HHS-OIG agents also provide protective services to the Secretary of HHS, and other department executives as necessary.

In 2002, the department released Healthy People 2010, a national strategic initiative for improving the health of Americans.

With the passage of the Fraud Enforcement and Recovery Act of 2009, and the Affordable Care Act of 2010, the Office of the Inspector General has taken an emboldened stance against healthcare related non-compliance, most notably for violations of Law and the Anti-Kickback Statute.

In 2015, the OIG issued a fraud alert as a warning to hospitals and healthcare systems to monitor and comply with their physician compensation arrangements.

Recent years have seen dramatic increases in both the number and the amounts of Stark Law violation settlements, prompting healthcare experts to identify a need for automated solutions that manage physician arrangements by centralizing necessary information with regard to physicianhospital integration. Contract management software companies such as Meditract provide options for health systems to organize and store physician contracts. Ludi Inc introduced DocTime Log®, an SaaS solution that specifically addresses this growing concern, automating physician time logging in compliance with contract terms to eliminate Stark Law and Anti-Kickback Statute violations.

According to a report released by the OIG in July 2019, more than 80 percent of the 4,563 U.S. hospice centers that provide care to Medicare beneficiaries surveyed from 2012 to 2016 have at least one deficiency and 20 percent have at least one "serious deficiency".

From January 2020, Christi Grimm became the principal deputy inspector general. She assumed the duties of an acting inspector general, because the inspector general post was empty. In April 2020, Grimm released a report which surveyed the state of hospitals in late March during the COVID-19 pandemic in the United States. The hospitals reported "severe shortages of testing supplies", "frequently waiting 7 days or longer for test results", which extended the length of patient stays and strained resources, and "widespread shortages of PPE". President Trump called the report "wrong" and questioned Grimm's motives. Later he called the report "Another Fake Dossier!" In May 2020, Trump nominated Jason Weida to be the permanent inspector general, pending confirmation by the U.S. Senate. According to a department spokeswoman, Grimm will remain as principal deputy inspector general.

Former operating divisions and agencies 
 Social Security Administration, made independent in 1995.

Budget and finances
The Department of Health and Human Services was authorized a budget for fiscal year 2020 of $1.293 trillion. The budget authorization is broken down as follows:

The FY2020 budget included a $1.276 billion budget decrease for the Centers for Disease Control, and a $4.533 billion budget decrease for the National Institutes of Health.  These budget cuts, along with other changes since 2019, comprised a total decrease of over $24 billion in revised discretionary budget authority across the entire Department of Health and Human Services for Fiscal Year 2020.

Additional details of the budgeted outlays, budget authority, and detailed budgets for other years, can be found at the HHS Budget website.

Programs 
The Department of Health & Human Services' administers 115 programs across its 11 operating divisions. The United States Department of Health & Human Services (HHS) aims to "protect the health of all Americans and provide essential human services, especially for those who are least able to help themselves." These federal programs consist of social service programs, civil rights and healthcare privacy programs, disaster preparedness programs, and health related research. HHS offers a variety of social service programs geared toward persons with low income, disabilities, military families, and senior citizens.  Healthcare rights are defined under HHS in the Health Insurance Portability and Accountability Act (HIPAA) which protect patient's privacy in regards to medical information, protects workers health insurance when unemployed, and sets guidelines surrounding some health insurance. HHS collaborates with the Office of the Assistant Secretary for Preparedness and Response and Office of Emergency Management to prepare and respond to health emergencies. A broad array of health related research is supported or completed under the HHS; secondarily under HHS, the Health Resources & Service Administration houses data warehouses and makes health data available surrounding a multitude of topics. HHS also has vast offering of health related resources and tools to help educate the public on health policies and pertinent population health information. Some examples of available resources include disease prevention, wellness, health insurance information, as well as links to healthcare providers and facilities, meaningful health related materials, public health and safety information.

Some highlights include:

 Health and social science research
 Preventing disease, including immunization services
 Assuring food and drug safety
 Medicare (health insurance for elderly and disabled Americans) and Medicaid (health insurance for low-income people)
 Health information technology
 Financial assistance and services for low-income families
 Improving maternal and infant health, including a Nurse Home Visitation to support first-time mothers
 Head Start (pre-school education and services)
 Faith-based and community initiatives
 Preventing child abuse and domestic violence
 Substance abuse treatment and prevention
 Services for older Americans, including home-delivered meals
 Comprehensive health services for Native Americans
 Assets for Independence
 Medical preparedness for emergencies, including potential terrorism
 Child support enforcement

The Health Insurance Portability and Accountability Act (HIPAA) 
This program is to ensure the accountability of medical professionals to respect and carry-out basic human health rights, under the act of the same name. In the United States, the government feels that it is essential for the American people to understand their civil duty and rights to all of their medical information. That includes: health insurance policies or medical records from every doctor or emergency visit in one's life. Through Health & Human services one is able to file a complaint that their HIPAA rights have been violated or a consultant that will be able to decide if their rights were violated.

Social Services 
This branch has everything to do with the social justice, wellness, and care of all people throughout the United States. This includes but is not limited to people who need government assistance, foster care, unaccompanied alien children, daycares (headstart included), adoption, senior citizens, and disability programs. Social services is one of (if not) the largest branch of programs underneath it that has a wide variety throughout the United States at a state and local level.

Prevention and Wellness 
The prevention and wellness program's main idea is to give the American people the ability to live the healthiest and best lifestyle physically that they can. They are the ones who deal with vaccines and immunizations, which fight from common diseases to deadly ones. The nutrition & fitness program that are the basics of healthy eating and regular exercise. Health screenings & family health history which are crucial in the knowledge of each individual's health and body. A severely important one especially in today's society is mental health and substance abuse in where they help people with mental illness and drug abuse. Lastly, they help with environmental health where people are researching and studying how our environments both physical and metaphorically have a short- and long-term effect on our health and wellness.

Strengthening Communities Fund
In June 2010, the Department of Health & Human Services created the Strengthening Communities Fund as part of the American Recovery and Reinvestment Act. The fund was appropriated $50 million to be given as grants to organizations in the United States who were engaged in Capacity Building programs. The grants were given to two different types of capacity builders:
 State, Local and Tribal governments engaged in capacity building: grants will go to state local and tribal governments to equip them with the capacity to more effectively partner with faith-based or non-faith based nonprofit organizations. Capacity building in this program will involve education and outreach that catalyzes more involvement of nonprofit organizations in economic recovery and building up nonprofit organization's abilities to tackle economic problems. State, Local and Tribal governments can receive up to $250,000 in two year grants
 Nonprofit Social Service Providers engaged in capacity building: they will make grants available to nonprofit organizations who can assist other nonprofit organizations in organizational development, program development, leadership, and evaluations. Nonprofits can receive up to $1 million in two year grants

Biodefense 
HHS plays a role in protecting the United States against bioterrorism events. In 2018, HHS released a new National Biodefense Strategy required by passage of the 2016 Biodefense Strategy Act. The Biodefense Strategy required implementation of a biodefense strategy after a 2015 Blue Ribbon Study Panel on Biodefense report found that the 2009 National Strategy for Countering Biological Threats was inadequate in protecting the U.S. The strategy adopted these five central recommendations: creating a single centralized approach to biodefense; implementing an interdisciplinary approach to biodefense that brings together policy makers, scientists, health experts, and academics; drawing up a comprehensive strategy to address human, plant, and animal health; creating a defense against global and domestic biological threats; and creating a proactive policy to combat the misuse and abuse of advanced biotechnology.

HHS also runs the Biodefense Steering Committee, which works with other federal agencies including the U.S. Department of State, U.S. Department of Defense, U.S. Food and Drug Administration, U.S. Department of Homeland Security, and the Environmental Protection Agency. HHS specifically oversees Project BioShield, established in 2003 and operating since 2004, and its development and production of genetically based bio-weapons and vaccines. HHS together with DHS are authorized under the Homeland Security Act of 2002 to deploy the weapons and vaccines produced by Project BioShield on the US general public under martial law during "emerging terrorist threats" or public health emergencies. Both HHS and DHS have similar authorities through state-based legislation adopted from Model State Emergency Health Powers Act provisions.

Criticisms and controversies 

In 2016, a published US Senate report revealed that several dozen unaccompanied children from Central America, some as young as 14 years old, were released from custody to traffickers where they were sexually assaulted, starved or forced to work for little or no pay. The HHS sub agency Office of Refugee Resettlement (ORR) released approximately 90,000 unaccompanied children during 2013–2015 but did not track their whereabouts or properly screen families accepting these children.

To prevent similar episodes, the Homeland Security and Health & Human Services Departments signed a memorandum of understanding in 2016, and agreed to establish joint procedures within one year for dealing with unaccompanied migrant children. As of 2018 they have failed to do so. Between October and December 2017, officials from ORR tried to contact 7,635 children and their sponsors. From these calls, officials learned that 6,075 children remained with their sponsors. Twenty-eight had run away, five had been removed from the United States and fifty-two had relocated to live with a non sponsor. However, officials have lost track of 1,475 children. ORR claims it is not legally liable for the safety and status of the children once released from custody.

HHS is evidenced to be actively coercing and forcing bio-substances such as antipsychotics on migrating children without consent, and under questionable medical supervision. Medical professionals state that wrongly prescribed antipsychotics are especially dangerous for children, and can cause permanent psychological damage. Medical professionals also state DHS and HHS incarceration and separation policies are likewise causing irreparable mental harm to the children.

Children are also dying in HHS custody. The forced drugging, deaths, and disappearances of migrating Mexican and Central American children might be related to DHS falsely labeling them and their families as 'terror threats' before HHS manages their incarcerations. Despite a federal court order, the DHS separation practices started by Obama and mandated by the Trump administration's "zero-tolerance" policy have not been halted, and HHS has not stopped forcing drugs on the children it incarcerates.

In August 2022, the Office of the Inspector General for Health and Human Services reported that NIH had failed in its oversight of clinical trials, with slightly over half of sample trial results either being tardy for publication or remaining unpublished on ClinicalTrials.gov after several years from the stated completion dates.

Freedom of Information Act processing performance
In the latest Center for Effective Government analysis of 15 federal agencies which receive the most Freedom of Information Act (FOIA) requests published in 2015 (using 2012 and 2013 data, the most recent years available), the DHHS ranked second to last, earning an F by scoring 57 out of a possible 100 points, largely due to a low score on its particular disclosure rules. It had deteriorated from a D− in 2013.

Related legislation 

 1946: Hospital Survey and Construction Act (Hill-Burton Act) PL 79-725
 1949:  Hospital Construction Act PL 81-380
 1950:  Public Health Services Act Amendments PL 81-692
 1955:  Poliomyelitis Vaccination Assistance Act PL 84-377
 1956:  Health Research Facilities Act PL 84-835
 1960:  Social Security Amendments (Kerr-Mill aid) PL 86-778
 1961: Community Health Services and Facilities Act PL 87-395
 1962: Public Health Service Act PL 87-838
 1962:  Vaccination Assistance PL 87-868
 1963:  Mental Retardation Facilities Construction Act/Community Mental Health Centers Act PL 88-164
 1964:  Nurse Training Act PL 88-581
 1965: Community Health Services and Facilities Act PL 89-109
 1965:  Medicare (United States)|Medicare PL 89-97
 1965:  Mental Health Centers Act Amendments PL 89-105
 1965:  Heart Disease, Cancer, and Stroke Amendments PL 89-239
 1966:  Comprehensive Health Planning and Service Act PL 89-749
 1970:  Community Mental Health Service Act PL 91-211
 1970: Family Planning Services and Population Research Act PL 91-572
 1970:  Lead-Based Paint Poisoning Prevention Act PL 91-695
 1971: National Cancer Act PL 92-218
 1974:  Research on Aging Act PL 93-296
 1974: National Health Planning and Resources Development Act PL 93-641
 1979: Department of Education Organization Act (removed education functions) PL 96-88
 1987:  Department of Transportation Appropriations Act PL 100-202
 1988: Medicare Catastrophic Coverage Act PL 100-360
 1989:  Department of Transportation and Related Agencies Appropriations Act PL 101-164
 1996: Health Insurance Portability and Accountability Act PL 104-191
 2000: Child Abuse Reform and Enforcement Act P.L. 106-177
 2010: Patient Protection and Affordable Care Act PL 111-148

See also

 American Recovery and Reinvestment Act (ARRA)
 Early Head Start
 Emergency Care Coordination Center
 Global Health Security Initiative
 Head Start
 Health information technology
 Health professional
 Healthy People 2010
 Human experimentation in the United States
 Rural health
 Stark Law
 Supporting Healthy Marriage Project
 Temporary EHR Certification Program
 William R. Steiger

References

External links 

 
 Department of Health and Human Services on USAspending.gov
 Department of Health & Human Services in the Federal Register
 Department of Health and Human Services reports and recommendations from the Government Accountability Office
 General Records of the Department of Health, Education and Welfare from the National Archives

 
1953 establishments in the United States
Government agencies established in 1953
Health